Franklin Erepamo Osaisai (born October 1, 1958) is a Nigerian nuclear engineer, energy scientist and former  Director-General and Chief Executive Officer of the Nigeria Atomic Energy Commission

Life and career
He had his secondary education in Bayelsa State, where he obtained the West Africa School Certificate (WASC) in June 1977.
He attended the University of Port Harcourt where he obtained a Bachelor of science (B.sc) degree in Chemistry from the School of Chemical Sciences of the university in May 1981.
He later received a graduate scholarship award, that earned him a master's  and Doctorate (P.hD) degree in  Nuclear engineering (1984-1987) from the University of California.
He started his career at the University of California as a lecturer before he joined the service of  the University of Port Harcourt where he specialized in Nuclear Reactor Engineering.
He later became the Director-General and Chief Executive Officer of the Nigeria Atomic Energy Commission (NAEC) under the administration of Chief Olusegun Obasanjo, the former President of the Federal Republic of Nigeria.
He had served in several professional organizations.

Fellowships and membership
Fellow of the Nigerian Academy of Engineering

See also
List of University of Port Harcourt people
University of Port Harcourt

References

External links
Franklin Osaisai profile

Nigerian nuclear engineers
1958 births
University of California alumni
University of Port Harcourt alumni
People from Bayelsa State
Living people
Heads of government agencies of Nigeria